Thong Girl is the comic book creation of writer and filmmaker Glen Weiss. What started out as an independent comic book has blossomed into a franchise that includes movies, video games, action figures, posters, tee shirts and more.

Description
Thong Girl is a crimefighting superhero who fights crime in a thong bikini and patrols the skies of Nashville, Tennessee (TN), also known as Music City, The United States of America (USA). By day, Thong Girl is an assistant district attorney named Lana Layonme. One day, while shopping in the French Quarter in New Orleans, Lana discovered a magical thong that gave her the ability to fly and shoot laser beams from her posterior. Armed with these new weapons, Lana assumed the role of superhero Thong Girl; her mission - to protect Music City and all of the hat-wearing country music stars from harm and hip-hop music.
Along with publishing comic books and selling Thong Girl merchandise, Thong Girl films has just released their first feature-length film Thong Girl 3: Revenge Of The Dark Widow and has recently signed actress and cyber-model Alex del Monacco in the lead role of Thong Girl. Also signed as the evil "Electar" is Will Jones, known around the world as "Dr. Epiphone", spokesman for Epiphone brand guitars. There is also a special cameo appearance by Troma Films founder Lloyd Kaufman. Production for Thong Girl 4: The Body Electric began in Fall of 2008 and the new film was scheduled to premier on April 7, 2011.
Thong Girl is the brainchild of writer/director Glen Weiss. His company Lucky Louie Productions makes short films, music videos and commercials. TG4 is their second feature-length film.

Controversy
Gallatin, Tennessee Mayor Don Wright's allowing of the filming of Thong Girl 3 in his office erupted into a local controversy.

References

External links
Thong Girl website
Purrsia Press, publishers of Thong Girl Comic archived at Wayback Machine
Thong Girl page at Comicspace archived at Wayback Machine
Thong Girl 4: The Body Electric on IMDB

Comics superheroes